Gelasinospora is a genus of fungi within the order Sordariales.

Reproduction
Gelasinospora as a genus is made up of perithecial fungi, meaning that they discharge their ascospores through an ostiole. 
Spores do not germinate easily, needing a treatment of temperature, chemicals or a combination of the two to initiate germination.
Like most ascomycetes, Gelasinospora species typically have 8 spores in each ascus.

References
C.J. Alexopolous, Charles W. Mims, M. Blackwell, Introductory Mycology, 4th ed. (John Wiley and Sons, Hoboken NJ, 2004)  

Sordariales